James Gabbert (born 1936 in Chico, California) is a radio and television engineer and entrepreneur, California Broadcasters Association 1994 Broadcaster of the Year, and past president of the National Radio Broadcasters Association.

He has owned and managed San Francisco Bay Area television station KOFY-TV and radio stations KIOI and KSOL, and Honolulu stations KIKI and KPIG-FM.

Gabbert lives in Sausalito.

Education
Gabbert studied electrical engineering at Stanford University.

Career

Radio
While in school in 1957, Gabbert founded KPEN-FM in Atherton.  and in 1968 changed its call sign to KIOI ("K-101").

Gabbert moved K101 to San Francisco and purchased KSAY (1010 AM), changing its call letters to KIQI.

In 1979, Gabbert acquired Honolulu stations KIKI and KPIG-FM.

Television
Gabbert sold his four radio stations and bought KEMO-TV (Channel 20) in San Francisco, changing its call sign to KTZO in October 1980. In 1986, KTZO became KOFY.

In 1994 Gabbert was approached by Warner Brothers and asked to be the Bay Area affiliate for the new WB Television Network.

Retirement
In 1998, Gabbert sold his last two radio stations, KOFY 1050 AM and KDIA 1310 AM, and KOFY-TV.

References

Additional sources
 

1936 births
Living people
Businesspeople from the San Francisco Bay Area
Mass media in the San Francisco Bay Area
People from Chico, California
Stanford University alumni
People from Sausalito, California
Television in the San Francisco Bay Area